Molvom is a Kuki village located in the Chümoukedima District of Nagaland.

Demographics 
Molvom is situated in the Chümoukedima District of Nagaland. As per the Population Census 2011, there are a total 241 households in Molvom. The total population of Molvom is 1391.

See also 
Chümoukedima District

References 

Villages in Chümoukedima district